John Farnham, billed under stage name Johnny Farnham from 1964 until 1979, is a British-born Australian pop singer who has released 21 studio albums, 6 live albums, 3 soundtracks, 19 compilation albums, 13 video albums, 3 extended plays and 74 singles.

Manager Kenn Brodziak changed his stage name to John Farnham in 1980, and he released his first album under this banner Uncovered, featuring his version of The Beatles hit single "Help!". His career has mostly been as a solo artist but he replaced Glenn Shorrock as lead singer of Little River Band during 1982–1985. Aside from solo releases, Farnham has recorded albums and duets with other artists or bands, including Tom Jones and Olivia Newton-John.

Background
Farnham was vocalist for The Mavericks from 1964, by late 1965 he had joined Strings Unlimited, In 1966, they recorded a three-track demo tape with Farnham on vocals, Stewart Male on lead guitar, Barry Roy on rhythm guitar, Mike Foenander on keyboards and Peter Foggie on drums. Talent manager, Darryl Sambell, saw Strings Unlimited perform on 29 April 1967 and encouraged Farnham to go solo. Farnham recorded an advertising jingle, "Susan Jones", for airline, Ansett-ANA, and signed a contract with EMI. Farnham's debut single was a novelty song, "Sadie (The Cleaning Lady)", released in November 1967. His debut extended play, Johnny Farnham, followed in December, and his single peaked at No. 1 on the Australian National Singles Charts for five weeks in early 1968. Selling 180,000 copies in Australia, "Sadie" was the highest selling single by an Australian artist of the decade. Farnham's debut studio album, Sadie was issued in April 1968. Other No. 1 singles are "Raindrops Keep Fallin' on My Head" in 1969–1970, "You're the Voice" in 1986 and "Age of Reason" in 1988; and his No. 1 albums are Whispering Jack in 1986–1987, Age of Reason in 1988, Chain Reaction in 1990, Then Again in 1993, Anthology 1: Greatest Hits 1986-1997 in 1997, Highlights from The Main Event with Olivia Newton-John and with Anthony Warlow in 1998, 33⅓ in 2000, The Last Time in 2002 and in 2015 and Friends for Christmas.

Albums

Studio albums

Live albums

Soundtrack albums

Compilation albums

Video albums

Notes

Extended plays

Singles

Notes
A."Sadie (The Cleaning Lady)" was originally released in November 1967 ahead of December's EP, Johnny Farnham, it subsequently appeared on the LP, Sadie in April 1968. It entered Go-Set National Top 40 on 13 December 1967 and peaked at No. 1 in January–February for five weeks. On the Kent Music Report, "Sadie" was No. 1 for six weeks.
B."Underneath the Arches" / "Friday Kind of Monday" was released as a Double A-sided single in May 1968. "Underneath the Arches" was a non-album release, while "Friday Kind of Monday" was from the EP, Johnny Farnham, in December 1967 and subsequently appeared on the LP, Sadie in April 1968.
C."Jamie" / "I Don't Want to Love You" was released as a Double A-sided single in July 1968. "I Don't Want to Love You" appeared on Johnny Farnham EP in December 1967. Both A-sides subsequently appeared on the LP, Everybody Oughta Sing a Song in November 1968.
D."Raindrops Keep Fallin' on My Head" was a cover of the B J Thomas song, it was released in November 1969, in early 1970 it peaked at No. 1 on both the Go-Set Singles Chart and Kent Music Report Singles Chart for seven weeks.
E."Baby, Without You" and the related album, Together, has Farnham teamed with Allison Durbin. Both Farnham as 'King of Pop' (1969–1973) and Durbin as 'Most Popular Female Performer' (1969–1971) were the most popular personalities in reader polls for the King of Pop Awards.
F.Charlie Girl is a stage musical which had Farnham as the male lead in the 1971 Australian production. The Australian cast released the stage album, Charlie Girl, which included the single, "Charlie Girl"; Farnham included "Charlie Girl" on his own album, Johnny Farnham Sings the Shows in 1972.
G."You're the Voice" did not chart in the US until 1990.

Guest appearances

See also
 Little River Band

References

General

External links

John Farnham at Rate Your Music

Discographies of Australian artists
Pop music discographies